Vedran Đipalo (born September 22, 1977 in Sinj, Split-Dalmacija) is an Olympic boxer from Croatia best known for winning a bronze medal at the 2004 European Amateur Boxing Championships.

Career
Đipalo won the bronze medal at 201 lbs at the 2004 European Amateur Boxing Championships in Pula, Croatia. At the 2004 World University Boxing Championships he also won Bronze.

He participated in the 2004 Summer Olympics for Croatia. He was beaten in the first round of the heavyweight (91 kg) division by Australia's Adam Forsyth.

External links
Yahoo! Sports
&sports-reference

1977 births
Living people
Heavyweight boxers
Boxers at the 2004 Summer Olympics
Olympic boxers of Croatia
People from Sinj
Croatian male boxers

Mediterranean Games bronze medalists for Croatia
Competitors at the 2005 Mediterranean Games
Mediterranean Games medalists in boxing
21st-century Croatian people